Ali Mohammadlu (also Romanized as ‘Alī Moḩammadlū) is a village in Meshgin-e Sharqi Rural District, in the Central District of Meshgin Shahr County, Ardabil Province, Iran. At the 2006 census, its population was 21, in 6 families.

References 

Towns and villages in Meshgin Shahr County